Lote (also known as Lohote) is an Austronesian language spoken by about 6,000 people who live around Cape Dampier on the south coast of New Britain in Papua New Guinea. The language was earlier known as Uvol, after the name of a local river, where the first wharf and later airstrip were built.

Phonology 
The phonology of Lote is as follows:

Vowels

Consonants

References

External links
 Lote Grammar Sketch

Mengen languages
Languages of East New Britain Province